Boyko or Boiko (Cyrillic: Бойко, Polish: Bojko) is a common surname among people with origins in Russia and Western Ukraine, including in Canada and the United States. It is one of the most common surnames in Ukraine.

It is also found in South Slavic countries, as a form of the name Бојан/Bojan (Boyan). The surname 'Boiko' is also common amongst Ashkenazi Jews (amongst whom it is spelled as 'Boiko' or 'Boico'), and possibly it is a form of 'Boge', or 'boikil' meaning "quick".

People

Surname
 Aleksandra Boiko (1918–1996), Soviet tank commander
 Andriy Boyko (born 1981), Ukrainian footballer
 Bohdan Boyko (born 1954), Ukrainian politician
 Brett Boyko (born 1992), Canadian football player
 Christopher A. Boyko (born 1954), American lawyer
 Darren Boyko (born 1964), Canadian ice hockey player
 Denys Boyko (born 1988), Ukrainian footballer
 Dmytro Boyko (born 1981), Ukrainian footballer
 Dmytro Boiko (born 1986), Ukrainian fencer
 Edgar Paul Boyko (1918–2002), American lawyer
 Eugene Boyko (1923–2003), Canadian film maker
 Georgi Boyko (1933–2002), Soviet and Ukrainian geologist
 Ivan Boyko (1910–1975), Soviet hero
 Natalya Boyko (born 1946), Soviet canoeist
 Oleg Boyko (born 1964), Russian oligarch
 Sergei Boyko (born 1971), Russian footballer
 Svetlana Boyko (born 1972), Russian fencer
 Vadzim Boyka, also Vadim Boyko (born 1978), Belarusian footballer
 Vitaliy Boyko (born 1997), Ukrainian footballer
 Yuriy Boyko (born 1958), Ukrainian politician

Given name
In Bulgaria, Boiko/Boyko is a given name.

 Boyko Borisov, Prime Minister of Bulgaria
 Boyko Velichkov, Bulgarian footballer
 Boiko Zvetanov, Bulgarian opera singer
 Boyko Mladenov, Bulgarian basketball player

See also
 
 
 
 Ukrainian surnames
 Boyko, a group of Ukrainian Carpathian people

References 
 

Ukrainian-language surnames
Surnames of Ukrainian origin